Empusa is a genus of praying mantids in the family Empusidae and tribe Empusini.  Records of occurrence include Africa, mainland Europe and western Asia through to India.

Species
E. binotata Serville, 1839
E. fasciata Brulle, 1832
E. guttula (Thunberg, 1815)
E. hedenborgii Stål, 1871
E. longicollis Ramme, 1950
E. neglecta Paulian, 1958
E. pauperata (Fabricius, 1781)
E. pennata (Thunberg, 1815)
E. pennicornis Pallas, 1773
E. romboidea Lindt, 1976
E. simonyi Krauss, 1902
E. spinosa Krauss, 1902
E. uvarovi Chopard, 1921

References

External links
Tree of Life - Empusa

 
Mantodea genera
Taxa named by Johann Karl Wilhelm Illiger
Mantodea of Africa
Mantodea of Europe